The Kawasaki Barako is a motorcycle model built by Kawasaki Motors Philippines. Launched in 2004, the Kawasaki Barako was designed to replace the older two-stroke Kawasaki HD-III which was launched back in 1982 and it continued production due to its maintenance simplicity, raw power, and popularity among tricyclists. unitil the HD-III was phased out in 2007, the BC 175 is primarily used as utility hauler for business needs. Its primary competitors include the Honda TMX series, the Yahama RS110F and Kawasaki's own (but sourced from Bajaj Auto of India) CT series of motorcycles. 

It was initially launched as the Kawasaki Barako 175 with an engine that originally came from the Eliminator, but with the implementation of stricter emissions regulations and an extremely competitive market, an enhanced version, the Kawasaki Barako II 175, was later launched.

There are two variants available in the market in which differs on how the motorcycle is started: a standard Barako with only a kick start and a higher variant of Barako both equipped with a kick start and an electric starter.

The engine of the Kawasaki Barako is also used on the Kawasaki W175 leisure bike, albeit with a different transmission setup and the lack of a kick starter.

Features 
Since the launch of the Kawasaki Barako in the Philippine market, this motorcycle has been known to be more powerful even with heavier loads thanks to its 177 cc displacement. Its four stroke engine is best suited for utility and business use and as with later model, the Barako II, the engine was tweaked to produce up to 15% more power and to be up to 13% more fuel efficient than earlier Barako. It has the power and versatility for pulling and carrying heavy loads and it maintains fuel efficiency of up to 57 km per liter. 

Like the other utility motorcycles, the Barako series has a long seat was placed behind the fuel tank to accommodate extra passenger. The frame was also modified for its future use for sidecar operation. It is equipped with Kawasaki Automatic Compression Release KACR, which makes kick starting much easier. The Compression release reduces rider pressure, ensuring a smooth operation. 

The utilization of a Secondary Air System (SAS) enables Barako series to initially pass Euro 2 emissions regulation which has been since upgraded to Euro III emissions regulation. 

In 2017, the Barako II has since been equipped with Fuel Gauge which is absent in earlier models. And recently as a response to newer models from rival manufacturers like the Honda TMX Supremo, its overall appearance was overhauled to give an improved sporty look. The brakes and the drivetrain was painted black and its chrome tailpipe was replaced with sportier racing inspired muffler.

References

Barako II